Malcolm Lee McBride (August 22, 1878 – December 21, 1941) was an American football player and coach.  He played college football at Yale University as a halfback and fullback, and was selected as an All-American in 1898 and 1899.  McBride was known for his skill as a left-footed kicker.  One newspaper described his punts as follows:"Malcolm McBride, who was a Yale fullback, was one of the stars of the kicking game in 1899.  He sent a long, low punt that was exceedingly hard to handle. It usually struck the ground and bounded some distance before the backs could recover it."  After graduating as part of Yale's class of 1900, McBride returned as the school's head football coach in 1900.  McBride's chief adviser as Yale's coach was Walter Camp, and his assistants were Frank Hinkey and Frank Butterworth.  McBride coached the 1900 Yale football team to a perfect 12–0 record.  The team base been acknowledged as the consensus national champion of the 1900 college football season.
In 1917, McBride was one of the directors of a program on "training camp activities for the promotion of recreative athletics" among soldiers encamped at various locations for participation in World War I.

Head coaching record

References

External links

1878 births
1941 deaths
19th-century players of American football
American football fullbacks
American football halfbacks
Yale Bulldogs football coaches
Yale Bulldogs football players
All-American college football players
Sportspeople from Cleveland
Players of American football from Cleveland